Penicillium canescens is an anamorph fungus species of the genus of Penicillium which was isolated from soil of the United Kingdom. Penicillium canescens produces the antibiotic canescin.

See also
List of Penicillium species

References 

canescens
Fungi described in 1912